GBK Dairy Products Limited, often referred to as GBK Dairy, is a dairy processing company in Uganda.

Location
The head office and factory of GBK Dairy Products Limited are located at 70–80 Mbarara–Kabale Road, in the central business district of Mbarara, the largest and most populated city in the Ankole sub-region of the Western Region of Uganda. The geographical coordinates of the head office of the company are:0°36'25.0"S, 30°39'42.0"E (Latitude:-0.606944; Longitude:30.661667).

Overview
GBK Dairy was opened in 1996, with capacity of 2,000 liters a day. As of May 2015, the plant's production capacity was 100,000 liters per day, although often the factory was under-utilized, producing only 20,000 to 30,000 liters daily, primarily due to a small market. The company's products are marketed locally within Uganda and to neighboring countries within the East African Community.

Ownership
GBK Dairy is a member and subsidiary of the GBK Group of companies which include (a) A milk-processing factory (a) A water purification plant, producing bottled drinking water and (c) A juice-extraction plant, manufacturing natural drinking juices. The factory manufactures the following products among others:
(a) pasteurized fresh milk (b) UHT milk (c) yoghurt and (d) ghee.

See also
List of milk processing companies in Uganda
Dairy industry in Uganda

References

External links
 Opportunities and challenges in Uganda’s dairy industry
Manufacture of Dairy in East Africa: 2018 Report 

Dairy products companies of Uganda
Ankole sub-region
1996 establishments in Uganda
Western Region, Uganda
Food and drink companies established in 1996
Mbarara District